"Situation" is a 1982 single by British synth-pop band Yazoo. The song was originally released in the UK as the B-side to Yazoo's debut single, "Only You", which went to number two on the UK Singles Chart. Released as a single in North America, the song peaked at number 73 on the Billboard Hot 100 chart in the US, and hit the top 40 in Canadian charts, peaking at number 31. In late-summer 1982 it became Yazoo's first song to top the Billboard Hot Dance Club Play chart, remaining at number one on this chart for four weeks. It also crossed over to the Black Singles chart, peaking at number 31.

Its most well-known version is the US 12-inch remix by François Kevorkian. This version was included on the US version of Yazoo's debut album, Upstairs at Eric's (1982), and is the version of the song which receives the most radio airplay in the United States (where the song, despite its modest showing on the Hot 100, is still played on alternative, variety-hits and dance-oriented radio stations).

In 1990, and again in 1999, the song was remixed by several noted DJs, including Peter Rauhofer and Richard "Humpty" Vission. The 1999 remixes were released to dance clubs. In October of that same year, this renewed interest in the song sent "Situation" to number one on the Billboard Hot Dance Club Play chart for a second time.

In 2006, Slant Magazine ranked the song at number 64 in their list of the "100 Greatest Dance Songs".

The song was heavily sampled for The Saturdays' 2008 debut single "If This Is Love".

Versions
The original version's first chorus does not have the response lyrics. The 7-inch version skips to the verses before the first chorus with response lyrics.

Track listings

1982 release
 UK 7-inch single (Mute Records 7MUTE020)
"Only You" – 3:11
"Situation" – 2:22

 UK 12-inch single (Mute 12MUTE020)
"Only You" – 3:11
"Situation (Extended Version)" – 5:18

 US 7-inch single (Sire Records 7-29953)
"Situation" – 3:44
"Situation (Dub Version) – 3:13

 US 12-inch single (Sire 0-29950)
"Situation" – 5:40
"Situation (Dub Version)" – 5:45

1990 remixes
 7-inch single (Mute Records YAZ4)
"Situation (Deadline Mix Edit)"
"State Farm (Madhouse Mix Edit)"

 12-inch single (Mute 12YAZ4 / Sire/Warner Bros. 21812-0)
"Situation (The Aggressive Attitude Mix)"
"Situation (Deadline Mix)"
"State Farm (Madhouse Mix)"

 CD single (Mute CDYAZ4 / Sire/Warner Bros. 21812-2)
"Situation (Single Remix)"
"State Farm (Madhouse Mix Edit)"
"Situation (The Aggressive Attitude Mix)"
"Situation (Space Dub)"

1999 remixes
 12-inch single (Mute 12YAZ6)
"Situation (Club 69 Speed Mix)"
"Situation (Richard "Humpty" Vission Visits The Dub)"
"Situation (Richard "Humpty" Vission Instrumental)"

 12-inch single (Mute L12YAZ6)
"Situation (Dave Ralph's Tea Freaks English Breakfast Mix)
"Situation (Club 69 Speed Dub)"

 CD single (Mute CD YAZ 6)
"Situation (Club 69 Radio Mix)"
"Situation (Club 69 Speed Mix)"
"Situation (Richard 'Humpty' Vission Visits The Dome Mix)"
"Situation (Dave Ralph's Tea Freaks English Breakfast Mix)"
"Situation (Deadline Mix)"
"State Farm (Madhouse Mix)"
"Situation (Daniel Miller/Mark Saunders 12-inch Mix)"
"State Farm (Play-Doh Dub)"
"Situation (Original US Dub)"

Accolades

(*) indicates the list is unordered.

Charts

Original version

Weekly charts

Year-end charts

Situation '90

1999 Mixes

See also
List of number-one dance singles of 1982 (U.S.)
List of number-one dance singles of 1999 (U.S.)

References

External links

1982 songs
1982 singles
1990 singles
1999 singles
Mute Records singles
Songs written by Alison Moyet
Songs written by Vince Clarke
Song recordings produced by Eric Radcliffe
Song recordings produced by Daniel Miller
Yazoo (band) songs